1977 Dutch hostage crisis may refer to:
 1977 Dutch school hostage crisis
 1977 Dutch train hijacking

See also 
 1975 Dutch hostage crisis (disambiguation)